Standard Gargoyle Decisions is singer-songwriter Robert Pollard's seventh release since the break-up of indie-rock band Guided by Voices. It was released October 9, 2007 alongside a second LP, Coast to Coast Carpet of Love. Pollard has described Coast to Coast Carpet of Love as exhibiting pop-sounding overtones, whereas Standard Gargoyle Decisions will feature more 'down and dirty' rock-and-roll.  The album leaked on the Merge Records website on September 24, 2007.

This album was nominated for the 2007 Shortlist Music Prize.

Track listing
All tracks written by Robert Pollard

 "The Killers"
 "Pill Gone Girl"
 "Hero Blows the Revolution"
 "Psycho-Inertia"
 "Shadow Port"
 "Lay Me Down"
 "Butcher Man"
 "Motion Sickness Ghosts"
 "I in the World"
 "Here Comes Garcia"
 "The Island Lobby"
 "Folded Claws"
 "Feel Not Crushed"
 "Accusations"
 "Don't Trust Anybody"
 "Come Here Beautiful"
 "Spider Eyes"

Personnel 

 Robert Pollard: Vocals, Guitar, Composer, Cover art
 Todd Tobias: Production, Engineer, Mixing, Producer
 Kevin Fennel: Intro on "The Killers"

References

2007 albums
Robert Pollard albums